Françoise Jezequel  (born 30 March 1970 in Morlaix) is a French footballer who played as a midfielder for the France women's national football team. She was part of the team at the UEFA Women's Euro 2001. On club level she plays for Saint-Brieuc in France.

References

External links
 
 

1970 births
Living people
French women's footballers
France women's international footballers
People from Morlaix
Women's association football midfielders
Division 1 Féminine players
Sportspeople from Finistère
Footballers from Brittany